Aeons are an Irish electronica duo made up of Muireann Nic Amhlaoibh and Pádraig Rynne. They released their first singles, "Bealtaine" ('Beltane') and "An Fhuil" ('Blood') in 2016, and their first album, Fís ('Vision') in May 2018.

NÓS Awards
The duo have received several nominations to, and have won twice in, the NÓS music awards, the principal awards for modern Irish-language music. In 2019, Aeons were nominated for 'Band/Musician of the Year'; Fís received a nomination for 'Album of the Year', and 'Cúramaí an tSaoil', one of the songs in Fís, was nominated for 'Song of the Year', although it was Kneecap, a rap duo from Belfast, who in the end won each of these awards. In 2017, Aeons won two NÓS awards, for 'Video of the Year', with the music video for Bealtaine, and 'Debut Act of the Year'. They also received three further nominations; Bealtaine and An Fhuil, both for 'Song of the Year', and the duo themselves for 'Band/Musician of the Year'.

These awards and nominations are summarised in the table below:

Discography

References 

Irish electronic music groups
Electronica music groups
Irish musical duos
Irish synthpop groups
Ambient music groups